Syed Abid Ali  (born 9 September 1941) is a former all-rounder Indian cricketer. He was a lower order batsman and a medium pace bowler. He played an important role in Indian cricket in the 1960s and 70s.

Early life
Abid Ali attended the St. George's Grammar School and All Saints High School in Hyderabad. In 1956, he was picked to play for Hyderabad Schools by the selectors, who were impressed by his fielding. He scored 82 against Kerala and won the best fielder's prize. A few years later when State Bank of Hyderabad formed a cricket team, he was given a job there. He started off as a wicket keeper before becoming a bowler.

Playing career
Abid made it to the Hyderabad junior side in 1958–59 and the state Ranji Trophy team in the next year. He hardly bowled in the first few years and did not score his first Ranji hundred till 1967. He was unexpectedly picked for the team to tour Australia and New Zealand that year.

He made it to the team for the first Test against Australia possibly in the place of the captain M. A. K. Pataudi who dropped out injured. Abid scored 33 in both innings and took 6 wickets for 55, the best by Indian on debut at this point. Sent in to open the batting in the third Test, he hit 47. This was followed by innings of 81 and 78 in the final Test.

Abid was the non-striker when Sunil Gavaskar scored the winning runs against the West Indies in the Port of Spain Test of 1971. When West Indies tried to chase a difficult target in the final Test of the series, Abid bowled Rohan Kanhai and Garry Sobers in consecutive balls. A few months later, he hit the winning boundary when India defeated England by four wickets at the Oval.

In the Manchester Test of the same series, he took the first four wickets for 19 runs before lunch on the first day to reduce England to 4 for 41.

He played nine more Test matches, and scored 70 runs against New Zealand in the 1975 World Cup. He continued to play first class cricket for four more years. Abid Ali scored more than 2000 runs and took over hundred wickets for Hyderabad in the Ranji Trophy. His highest individual score was 173 not out against Kerala in 1968-69 and his best bowling was 6 for 23 against Surrey at the Oval in 1974.

Coaching career
Abid coached the junior team of Hyderabad for a few years, before moving to California in 1980. He coached Maldives in late 1990s and UAE between 2002 and 2005. Before coaching UAE, he trained the Andhra team that won the South Zone league in Ranji Trophy in 2001-02. He currently continues to reside in California, where he now coaches promising youngsters at the Stanford Cricket Academy.

Personal life
Obituaries for Abid Ali appeared in the media in the early 1990s; in fact he survived heart bypass surgery. His death was mistakenly announced  on the air by Farokh Engineer.

He has two children, a daughter and a son. He resides in the US.

See also
 List of India cricketers who have taken five-wicket hauls on Test debut

References

Bibliography
 Sujit Mukherjee, Matched winners, Orient Longman (1996), p 76-90
 Christopher Martin-Jenkins, Who's Who of Test Cricketers

External links
 

1941 births
Cricketers at the 1975 Cricket World Cup
Hyderabad cricketers
India One Day International cricketers
India Test cricketers
Indian cricketers
South Zone cricketers
State Bank of India cricketers
Living people
Telugu people
Cricketers who have taken five wickets on Test debut
Coaches of the United Arab Emirates national cricket team
Indian cricket coaches
Cricketers from Hyderabad, India
Alumni of All Saints High School, Hyderabad